Irvin Peter Rockman CBE (6 April 1938 – 30 August 2010) was an Australian politician, businessman, and hotelier who served as Lord Mayor of Melbourne from 1977 to 1979.

In the early 1960s he established a chain of luxury motels known as the Parkroyal in Melbourne, Canberra and Brisbane. Designed by Theodore Bertram, they were distinguished by a large parabolic arch at the entrance.

Rockman was alleged to have been involved in a 1988 drug smuggling scandal, but no charges were ever filed and Rockman maintained his innocence.

Personal life
Rockman was born on 6 April 1938 to Norman and Susie Rockman. His father's family had fled Poland due to anti-Jewish persecution, as had his mother's family, who had fled  from Ukraine. They settled in Melbourne, where Norman Rockman established a chain of clothing stores, which operated under the family name. Rockman attended high school at Wesley College. He then attended the University of Melbourne, where he undertook a commerce degree. Rockman was also a well-known underwater diver.

Irvin Rockman was married three times and had six children.

Ronald Simon Rockman Cousin and Close Friend of Irvin was also an Award Winning Photographer published in Australia, America and Europe

References

1938 births
2010 deaths
Jewish Australian politicians
Commanders of the Order of the British Empire
Mayors and Lord Mayors of Melbourne
Businesspeople from Melbourne
University of Melbourne alumni
Deaths from cancer in Victoria (Australia)
Australian underwater divers

Fathom guest photographer Irvin Rockman pages 8-11